Vicary may refer to:

Given name
 Vicary Gibbs (1751–1820), English judge and politician
 Vicary Gibbs, 6th Baron Aldenham (born 1948), British peer
 Vicary Gibbs (St Albans MP) (1853–1932), British barrister, merchant and Conservative politician

Surname
 James Vicary (born 1915), American mind-control theorist
 Renee Lynn Vicary (1957–2002), American competitive bodybuilder
 Richard Vicary (1918–2006), British artist and printmaker

See also
 Vicarage
 Vicari, a commune in Palermo, Italy
 Vicary House (disambiguation)

English given names
English masculine given names